The Volkswagen-Audi V8 engine family is a series of mechanically similar, gasoline-powered and diesel-powered, V-8, internal combustion piston engines, developed and produced by the Volkswagen Group, in partnership with Audi, since 1988. They have been used in various Volkswagen Group models, and by numerous Volkswagen-owned companies. The first spark-ignition gasoline V-8 engine configuration was used in the 1988 Audi V8 model; and the first compression-ignition diesel V8 engine configuration was used in the 1999 Audi A8 3.3 TDI Quattro. The V8 gasoline and diesel engines have been used in most Audi, Volkswagen, Porsche, Bentley, and Lamborghini models ever since. The larger-displacement diesel V8 engine configuration has also been used in various Scania commercial vehicles; such as in trucks, buses, and marine (boat) applications.

Discontinued production engines

Gasoline
All Volkswagen Group V8 gasoline engines are constructed from a lightweight, cast aluminum alloy cylinder block (crankcase) and cylinder heads.  They all use multi-valve technology, with the valves being operated by two overhead camshafts per cylinder bank (sometimes referred to as 'quad cam').  All functions of engine control are carried out by varying types of Robert Bosch GmbH Motronic electronic engine control units.  They are all longitudinally front-mounted, and the V8 engines listed below were for a long time only used in cars bearing the Audi marque, but latterly being installed in Volkswagen Passenger Cars flagship Volkswagen Phaeton.

3.6 V8 32v 184kW 
identification parts code prefix: 077, ID code: PT
engine displacement & engine configuration  90° V8; bore x stroke: , stroke ratio: 0.94:1 – undersquare/long-stroke, 445.2 cc per cylinder; compression ratio: 10.6:1
cylinder block & crankcase cast aluminium alloy; five main bearings, die-forged steel crankshaft
cylinder heads & valvetrain cast aluminium alloy; four valves per cylinder, 32 valves total, timing belt and simplex chain-driven (hybrid system) double overhead camshafts
fuel system, ignition system, engine management common rail multi-point electronic sequential indirect fuel injection with eight intake manifold-sited fuel injectors; twin Hitachi ignition coils (one per cylinder bank) with Bosch longlife spark plugs, Bosch Motronic electronic engine control unit (ECU); 95 RON/ROZ(91 AKI) EuroPremium (regular) unleaded recommended for optimum performance and fuel economy
DIN-rated motive power & torque output  at 5,800 rpm;  at 4,000 rpm
application Audi V8 (10/88-11/93)

3.7 V8 32v 169kW 
identification parts code prefix: 077, ID codes: AEW, AKJ
engine displacement & engine configuration  90° V8; bore x stroke: , stroke ratio: 1.03:1 – oversquare/short-stroke, 462.1 cc per cylinder; compression ratio: 10.8:1
cylinder block & crankcase cast aluminium alloy; five main bearings, die-forged steel crankshaft
cylinder heads & valvetrain cast aluminium alloy; four valves per cylinder, 32 valves total, timing belt and simplex chain-driven (hybrid system) double overhead camshafts
fuel system, ignition system, engine management common rail multi-point electronic sequential indirect fuel injection with eight intake manifold-sited fuel injectors; twin LAZ pre-power output stage control units (one per cylinder bank) and eight single spark ignition coils with Bosch longlife spark plugs, Bosch Motronic electronic engine control unit (ECU); 95 RON/ROZ(91 AKI) EuroPremium (regular) unleaded recommended for optimum performance and fuel economy
DIN-rated motive power & torque output  at 5,500 rpm;  at 2,700 rpm
application Audi D2 A8 (AEW: 07/95-12/98, AKJ: 06/97-12/98)

3.7 V8 40v 191-206kW 
identification parts code prefix: 077
engine displacement & engine configuration  90° V8; bore x stroke: , stroke ratio: 1.03:1 – oversquare/short-stroke, 462.1 cc per cylinder; compression ratio: 11.0:1 (BFL: 11.3:1)
cylinder block & crankcase cast aluminium alloy; five main bearings, die-forged steel crankshaft
cylinder heads & valvetrain cast aluminium alloy; five valves per cylinder, 40 valves total, low friction roller rocker fingers, timing belt and simplex chain-driven (hybrid system) hollow double overhead camshafts, variable inlet camshaft timing
aspiration 3-stage variable composite intake manifold
fuel system, ignition system, engine management common rail multi-point electronic sequential indirect fuel injection with eight intake manifold-sited fuel injectors; eight single spark ignition coils with Bosch longlife spark plugs, Bosch Motronic electronic engine control unit (ECU); 95 RON/ROZ(91 AKI) EuroPremium (regular) unleaded recommended for optimum performance and fuel economy
DIN-rated motive power & torque outputs, ID codes
  at 6,000 rpm;  at 3,250 rpm — AQG, AKC
  at 6,000 rpm;  at 3,750 rpm — BFL
applications Audi D2 A8 (AQG: 10/98-02/01, AKC: 05/00-09/02), Audi D3 A8 (BFL: 11/02-05/06)

Awards 
was voted 'best technical innovation', and awarded the "Golden Pegasus" by "Za ruljom" at the Moscow Motor Show

4.2 V8 32v 206-250kW 
identification parts code prefix: 0215

engine displacement & engine configuration  90° V8; bore x stroke: , stroke ratio: 0.91:1 – undersquare/long-stroke, 521.5 cc per cylinder; compression ratio: 10.3:1 (ABH: 10.8:1)
cylinder block & crankcase cast aluminium alloy; five main bearings, die-forged steel crankshaft
cylinder heads & valvetrain cast aluminium alloy; four valves per cylinder, 32 valves total, timing belt and simplex chain-driven (hybrid system) double overhead camshafts
fuel system, ignition system, engine management common rail multi-point electronic sequential indirect fuel injection with eight intake manifold-sited fuel injectors; Bosch Motronic electronic engine control unit (ECU); 98 RON/ROZ(93 AKI) EuroSuperPlus (premium) unleaded recommended for maximum performance and fuel economy
dimensions mass:  depending on variant
DIN-rated motive power & torque outputs, ID codes
  at 5,800 rpm;  at 4,000 rpm — ABH
  at 5,900 rpm;  at 4,000 rpm — AEC
  at 6,000 rpm;  at 3,000 rpm — ABZ, AKG, ARS, ASG
  at 6,600 rpm;  at 3,500 rpm — AHK
  at 6,600 rpm;  at 3,500 rpm — AHC, AKH, AQJ
applications Audi V8 (ABH: 08/91-11/93), Audi C4 S4 (ABH: 10/92-07/94), Audi C4 S6 (AEC: 09/94-10/97), Audi C5 A6 (ARS: 04/99-05/01, ASG: 06/00-01/05), Audi D2 A8 (ABZ: 06/94-05/99, AKG: 06/97-12/98), Audi C4 S6 Plus (AHK: 06/96-10/97), Audi C5 S6 (AQJ: 09/99-05/01), Audi D2 S8 (AHC: 09/96-12/98, AKH: 08/97-12/98)

4.2 V8 40v 220-265kW 
identification parts code prefix: 077
engine displacement & engine configuration  90° V8; bore x stroke: , stroke ratio: 0.91:1 – undersquare/long-stroke, 521.5 cc per cylinder; compression ratio: 11.0:1
cylinder block & crankcase cast aluminium alloy; five main bearings, die-forged steel crankshaft
cylinder heads & valvetrain cast aluminium alloy; five valves per cylinder, 40 valves total, timing belt and simplex chain-driven (hybrid system) double overhead camshafts
fuel system, ignition system, engine management two linked common rail fuel distributor rails, multi-point electronic sequential indirect fuel injection with eight intake manifold-sited fuel injectors; Bosch Motronic electronic engine control unit (ECU); 98 RON/ROZ(93 AKI) EuroSuperPlus (premium) unleaded recommended for maximum performance and fuel economy
DIN-rated motive power & torque outputs, ID codes
  at 6,200 rpm;  at 3,000 rpm — ARS, ASG
  at 6,200 rpm;  at 3,000 rpm — AUX, AWN
  at 7,000 rpm;  at 3,400 rpm — AQJ, ANK
  at 7,000 rpm;  at 3,400 rpm — AQH, AVP, AYS, BCS
applications Audi C5 A6 (ARS: 99-00, ASG: 00-04), Audi D2 A8 (AUX: 99-01, AWN: 01-02), Audi C5 S6 (AQJ: 99-01, ANK: 01-04), Audi S8 Plus (D2) (AQH: 05/99-02/01, AVP: 09/00-09/02, {Japan only – BCS: 09/00-02/01, AYS: 02/01-09/02})

4.2 V8 40v T 331-353kW (C5 RS6) 
Based on the existing 4.2 V8 from the Audi C5 S6, this engine was tuned with the assistance of VW Group subsidiary Cosworth Technology (now MAHLE Powertrain), and featured two parallel turbochargers, known as 'biturbo', with two side-mounted intercoolers (SMICs).  Enlarged and modified intake and exhaust ports on the new five valve cylinder heads, together with new induction and dual branch exhaust systems, a re-calibrated Motronic engine management system, revised cooling system, and decorative carbon fibre engine covers complete the upgrade.

identification parts code prefix: 077.A
engine displacement & engine configuration  90° V8; bore x stroke: , stroke ratio: 0.91:1 – undersquare/long-stroke, 521.5 cc per cylinder; compression ratio: 9.8:1, two oil coolers – oil:water and oil:air, two or three (dependent on target market) coolant radiators
cylinder block & crankcase cast aluminium alloy; five main bearings, die-forged steel crossplane crankshaft with shared crankpins, two-part oil sump – upper: baffled cast alloy, lower: pressed steel, simplex roller chain driven oil pump
cylinder heads & valvetrain cast aluminium alloy; five valves per cylinder (three inlet, and two sodium-cooled exhaust valves), 40 valves total, low-friction roller-bearing finger cam followers with automatic hydraulic valve clearance compensation, timing belt and simplex roller chain-driven (hybrid system) hollow-tube double overhead camshafts (the crankshaft-driven timing belt operates both exhaust camshafts, which in turn individually chain-drive the inlet camshafts), variable inlet camshaft timing
aspiration two carbon fibre-cased siamesed air filters, two hot-film air mass meters, cast alloy intake manifold with Bosch 'E-Gas' drive by wire electronic throttle control valve, 'biturbo' – two fast-acting turbochargers (one per cylinder bank) with vacuum-actuated excess pressure control, two all-alloy side-mounted intercoolers (SMICs) optimised to prevent pressure loss
fuel system, ignition system, engine management fuel tank sited electric low pressure fuel lift pump, underfloor electric high pressure relay fuel pump, common rail multi-point electronic sequential indirect fuel injection with eight intake manifold-sited fuel injectors; eight individual single-spark ignition coils, NGK longlife spark plugs; Bosch Motronic ME 7.1.1 electronic engine control unit (ECU); 98 RON/ROZ(93 AKI) EuroSuperPlus (premium) unleaded recommended for maximum performance and fuel economy
exhaust system dual-branch exhaust pipes with metallic-element catalytic converters and secondary air injection, four lambda sensors, European EU3 emissions standard
DIN-rated motive power & torque outputs, ID codes & applications
  at 5,700–6,400 rpm;  at 1,950–5,600 rpm — BCY: Audi C5 RS6 (07/02-09/04)
  at 6,000–6,400 rpm;  at 1,950–6,000 rpm — BRV: Audi C5 RS6 Plus (04/04-09/04)

Diesel

3.3 V8 32v TDI CR 165kW
identification parts code prefix: 057.A; ID code: AKF
engine configuration & engine displacement 90° V8 engine, Turbocharged Direct Injection (TDI) turbodiesel; ; bore x stroke: , stroke ratio: 0.91:1 - undersquare/long-stroke, 416.0 cc per cylinder, compression ratio: 18.5:1, up to  cylinder pressure,
cylinder block & crankcase compacted vermicular graphite cast iron (GJV/CGI); two-part cast aluminium alloy oil sump, five  diameter main bearings, die–forged steel crossplane crankshaft with shared crankpins, diagonally split connecting rods, simplex roller chain-driven oil pump, pistons oil-cooled by cast-in cooling ducts
cylinder heads & valvetrain cast aluminium alloy; four valves per cylinder, 32 valves total, sliding-finger cam followers with automatic hydraulic valve clearance compensation, 2x hybrid-driven double overhead camshafts (2xDOHC - two overhead camshafts per cylinder bank - 'quad cam', inlet camshafts are driven from a front-sited timing belt from the crankshaft, exhaust camshafts are gear-driven at the rear from the inlet camshafts)
aspiration twin-turbo: two electronically controlled turbochargers with variable turbine geometry (VTG) (one turbo per cylinder bank),  maximum absolute pressure, combined 4-part inlet manifold and air-to-water intercooler mounted within the vee. With additional side-mounted coolant radiator and additional electric coolant pump
fuel system & engine management (Common rail system) Low-pressure fuel lift pump mounted underneath the car turns on only when starter is being operated (when cranking); after that an electromagnetic valve bypass the pump. It uses a gear-type lift pump mounted on the passenger-side cylinder head driven by the camshaft; it is used to supply the high-pressure pump with sufficient pressure. Bosch CP3 high-pressure pump is used driven by the timing belt. Max rail pressure is 1350bar. Watercooled return line fuel cooler with an additional cooling pump (runs all the time) and side-mounted radiator and air-cooled return line cooler mounted on the bottom of the car. six-hole solenoid injection nozzles, CR electronic injection control. Dual Bosch EDC15 engine management computers running in master/slave configuration.
exhaust system vacuum-operated water-cooled exhaust gas recirculation, two catalysts, European EU3 emissions standard compliant
dimensions length: , width: , height: 
DIN-rated power & torque output  at 4,000 rpm;  at 1,800-3,000 rpm
best specific consumption 205 g/kWh (41.1% energy efficiency)
application Audi D2 A8 quattro (12/99-09/02)

4.0 V8 32v TDI CR 202kW
When introduced in May 2003, this 3.9 litre V8 was the highest power and highest torque diesel V8 fitted in any production car worldwide.  This was the second 'new' V engine from Audi which utilises new technologies - including chain-driven overhead camshafts and ancillary units, following the 4.2 40-valve V8 petrol engine first seen in the B6 S4.  This engine was discontinued in July 2005, superseded by the bored-out and updated but fundamentally identical 4.2 V8 TDI.
identification parts code prefix: 057.B, ID code: ASE
cylinder block & crankcase compacted vermicular graphite cast iron (GJV/CGI); cast reinforcing bed-plate lower frame incorporating five main bearings with each bearing affixed by four bolts, three-part oil sump consisting of cast alloy upper section, a middle baffle section and pressed steel lower section, die–forged steel crossplane crankshaft with shared crankpins, diagonally fracture-split connecting rods, chain-driven ancillaries, oil filter module (incorporating oil separator and water-to-oil cooler) mounted within the 'vee'
cylinder heads & valvetrain cast aluminium alloy; four valves per cylinder, 32 valves total, operated by low-friction roller finger cam followers with automatic hydraulic valve clearance compensation, 2x double overhead camshafts (2xDOHC - two overhead camshafts per cylinder bank - 'quad cam') - the inlets driven in a relay method at the rear (flywheel) end of the engine by four simplex roller chains and the exhausts driven from the inlets by automatic slack adjusting spur gears at the front end, two unequal-length swirl-inducing switchable inlet ports, siamesed unequal-length exhaust ports
fuel system & engine management electric low-pressure fuel lift pump, one toothed belt driven  injection pump, one central fuel distributor supplying two common rail (CR) fuel rails (one per cylinder bank), Bosch solenoid-valve injectors with seven-hole nozzles for homogenous fuel delivery, single and double pilot injection; Bosch EDC16 electronic engine control unit (ECU)
exhaust system twin water-cooled exhaust gas recirculation (mounted within the 'vee'), air-gap insulated fan-branch alloy steel exhaust manifolds, two close-coupled primary catalytic converters plus two main underfloor converters, Euro3 emissions standard
dimensions length: , mass: 
DIN-rated power & torque output ;  at 1,800-2,500 rpm
application Audi D3 A8 4.0 TDI quattro (05/03-07/05)

Current production engines

Gasoline
Of their eight-cylinder petrol engines, all Volkswagen Group V8 engines are primarily constructed from a lightweight cast aluminium alloy cylinder block (crankcase) and cylinder heads. They all use multi-valve technology, with the valves being operated by two overhead camshafts per cylinder bank (sometimes referred to as 'quad cam'). All functions of engine control are carried out by varying types of Robert Bosch GmbH Motronic electronic engine control units.

These V8 petrol engines initially were only used in cars bearing the Audi marque, but are now also installed in Volkswagen Passenger Cars 'premium models'. They are all longitudinally orientated, and with the exception of the Audi R8, are front-mounted.

4.2 V8 FSI 32v

Based on the existing Audi 40 valve V8, this new engine is heavily revised over its predecessor, with all-new components including: crankshaft, connecting rods and pistons, cylinder heads, and valvetrain, oil and cooling system, intake and exhaust system, and engine management system. It is available in two versions; a basic or 'comfort' version, first used in the Audi Q7; and a sports-focussed high-revving version, with features borrowed from motorsport, for the B7 RS 4 quattro and the R8. This is the first eight-cylinder road car engine to use Fuel Stratified Injection (FSI), which was successfully developed by Audi in their Le Mans-winning R8 racing car. The 5.2 V10 FSI was developed directly from this V8 engine.
identification parts code prefix/variant: 079.D
displacement & configuration  90° V8 engine;  cylinder bank offset;  cylinder spacing; bore and stroke: , stroke ratio: 0.91:1 – undersquare/long-stroke, 520.4 cc per cylinder, compression ratio: 12.5:1, firing order: 1–5–4–8–6–3–7–2; water:oil lubricant cooler (RS 4/R8 utilises an additional thermostatically controlled air:oil cooler); Q7 and RS 4 utilise a wet sump system (RS 4 with additional longitudinal axis flapped baffles controlled by lateral g-force), R8 uses dry sump
cylinder block & crankcase homogeneous monoblock low-pressure chill gravity die casting hypereutectic 'Alusil' aluminium-silicon alloy (AlSi17Cu4Mg) with a closed-deck design, mechanically stripped hard silicon crystal integral liners, honed under simulated mechanical stress; reinforced by a cast lower crankcase alloy bedplate (AlSi17Cu4Mg) mimicking a ladder-frame design, and including five GGG50 nodular cast iron press-fit main bearing caps each attached by four bolts;  overall length,  cylinder block height; two-stage 3/8" simplex roller chain and gear driven 'accessory drive' which includes the oil pump, water pump, power steering pump, and air conditioning compressor; baffle-plate sump
cylinder heads & valvetrain cast aluminium alloy, partition-plate horizontally divided intake ports producing a tumble effect (larger cross-section on RS 4/R8); four valves per cylinder: chrome-plated solid-stem (hollow-stem on RS 4/R8) intake valves, and chrome-plated sodium-filled hollow-stem exhaust valves, both with  valve lift (longer valve lift on RS 4/R8), 32 valves total; lightweight low-friction roller finger cam followers (uprated with peened rollers on RS 4/R8) with automatic hydraulic valve clearance compensation, double overhead camshafts (each a hollow tube composite) on each cylinder bank, driven from the flywheel side via a two-stage chain drive using three 3/8" simplex roller chains (sleeve-type on RS 4/R8), valve opening (in crank angle degrees) 200 intake (230 for RS 4/R8) and 210 e exhaust (230 for RS 4/R8); valve overlap facilitates integral exhaust gas recirculation; continuous hydraulic vane-adjustable variable valve timing for intake and exhaust camshafts with up to 42 degrees adjustment, each controlled via information from Hall sensors, Audi "RS" 'red' plastic cam covers on RS 4, 'anthracite' plastic on R8
aspiration two single-entry air filters each with hot-film air mass flow meters (Q7), or triple-entry single air filter with single hot-film air mass meter (RS 4), or double-entry dual-element single air filter with two hot-film air mass flow meters (R8); single (Q7 & RS 4) or twin (R8) cast alloy throttle body electronically controlled Bosch E-Gas throttle valves (Bosch  diameter on Q7, Pierburg  diameter on RS4), two-stage four-piece gravity die-cast (Q7) (sand-cast on RS 4/R8) magnesium-aluminium alloy variable length intake manifold with electronically map-controlled silicon tipped tract-length flaps along with tumble flaps inducing a swirling movement in the drawn air (RS 4 & R8 do not use a variable tract-length intake manifold)
ignition system & engine management mapped direct ignition with centrally mounted longlife spark plugs and eight individual direct-acting single spark coils; Bosch Motronic MED 9.1.1 electronic engine control unit (ECU) (two MED 9.1 ECUs in the RS 4 and R8, working on the 'master and slave' concept due to the high revving nature of the engine), four knock sensors, EU4 emissions standard, map-controlled coolant thermostat (Q7 only), additional electric after-run coolant pump with two additional side-mounted radiators (RS 4/R8), water-cooled alternator, two map-controlled radiator fans
exhaust system vacuum-controlled secondary air injection to assist cold start operation; air-gap insulated exhaust manifold per cylinder bank (Q7), or 4-into-2-into-1 fan-branch exhaust manifold per cylinder bank to minimise reverse pulsation of expelled exhaust gases (RS 4), or fan branch manifold with integrated catalytic converter per cylinder bank; two close-coupled and two main underfloor catalytic converters – ceramic on Q7, high-flow metallic on RS 4, or main catalytic converter integrated into transverse main rear silencer with quad outlets; four heated oxygen (lambda) sensors (broadband upstream, nonlinear downstream) monitoring pre- and post-catalyst exhaust gases; siamesed absorption-type middle silencer (Q7 with crossover) and siamesed rear silencer, separate rear silencers on RS 4 with vacuum-operated flap valves
dimensions Q7 (for auto transmission with plate-type flywheel): approx. , RS4 (for 6-speed manual with dual-mass flywheel): approx. 
DIN-rated power & torque outputs, ID codes, applications
  at 6,800 rpm;  at 3,500 rpm, 85% available from 2,000 rpm — BAR: Audi Q7 (03/06-05/10), Volkswagen Touareg (06/06-05/10); BVJ: Audi C6 A6 (05/06-08/11), Audi D3 A8 (06/06-07/10)
  at 7,000 rpm — CAU: Audi S5 (06/07-03/12)
  at 8,250 rpm;  at 4000–6000 rpm, 90% available between 2,250 and 7600 rpm, 8,500 rpm rev limiter — CFSA: Audi RS 4 (B8) (06/12-09/15); Audi RS 5 (06/2010-09/17)

Awards
was placed in the 2005 and 2006 annual list of Ward's 10 Best Engines

4.2 V8 40v
identification parts code prefix: 079
engine displacement & engine configuration  90° V8 engine;  cylinder spacing; bore x stroke: , stroke ratio: 0.91:1 – undersquare/long-stroke, 520.4 cc per cylinder
cylinder block & crankcase homogeneous monobloc low-pressure gravity die cast hypereutectic 'Alusil' aluminium-silicon alloy (AlSi17Cu4Mg) with a closed-deck design, mechanically stripped hard silicon crystal integral liners, honed under simulated mechanical stress; five main bearings; die-forged steel crankshaft
cylinder heads & valvetrain cast aluminium alloy, five valves per cylinder, 40 valves total; lightweight low-friction roller cam followers with automatic hydraulic valve clearance compensation, roller chain-driven double overhead camshafts
aspiration synthetic material two-stage variable intake manifold
fuel system & engine management two linked common rail fuel distributor rails, multi-point electronic sequential indirect fuel injection with eight intake manifold-sited fuel injectors; Bosch Motronic ME 7.1.1. electronic engine control unit (ECU); 98 RON/ROZ (93 AKI) EuroSuperPlus (premium) unleaded recommended for maximum performance and fuel economy
exhaust system two multi-stage catalytic converters
dimensions length: , mass: 
DIN-rated motive power & torque outputs, ID codes
  at 6,600 rpm;  at 3,500 rpm, 6,800 rpm max — Audi A6, BAT,  A8:  BFM (BFM engine is belt driven)
  at 6,200 rpm;  at 2,700–4,600 rpm, 6,500 rpm max — Audi A6 allroad: BAS
  at 7,000 rpm;  at 3,500 rpm — Audi S4: BBK (03/03-03/09)
  at 7,200 rpm;  at 3,000 rpm — Audi S4: BHF (03/03-03/09 – US/Korea only)
  at 6,500 rpm;  at 2,800-3,700 rpm — Volkswagen Phaeton: BGH, BGJ (Belt driven)
applications Audi B6 S4, Audi B7 S4, Audi C5 A6 allroad (BAS: 07/02-08/05), Audi C6 A6 (BAT: 05/04-05/06), Audi A8 (BFM: 10/02-07/10), Volkswagen Phaeton (BGJ: 05/03-07/03, BGH: 08/03-05/10)

Awards
was placed in the 2004 annual list of Ward's 10 Best Engines

4.0 TFSI
This engine is part of Audi's modular 90° V6/V8 engine family. It shares its bore and stroke, 90° V-angle, and 90mm cylinder spacing with the Audi V6. The earlier V6 engines (EA837) used an Eaton TVS Supercharger instead of turbocharger(s). In 2016, Audi and Porsche released a new turbocharged V6 engine they dubbed EA839. These 2.9L (biturbo) & 3.0L (single turbo) V6 engines share the 4.0T TFSI V8's “hot vee” design, meaning the turbo(s) are placed in the Vee of the engine (between each bank of cylinders) instead of on the outside of each cylinder bank. This allows the turbocharger(s) to produce boost pressure more quickly as the path the exhaust gases travel is much reduced. It also aids in getting the engine's emissions hardware up to temperature more quickly. As with the V6, the V8 is used in various Audi and Porsche models, but the V8 also finds use in Bentley and Lamborghini vehicles.

engine displacement & engine configuration  90° V8 engine;  cylinder spacing; bore x stroke: , stroke ratio: 0.95:1 – undersquare/long-stroke, 499.1 cc per cylinder, compression ratio: 10.5:1
fuel system; Fuel Stratified Injection (FSI) Central-Overhead Injectors
exhaust system two twin-scroll turbo chargers and twin air- and water-cooled intercoolers
DIN-rated motive power & torque outputs, ID codes, applications
 at 5,500 rpm;  from 1,400 rpm to 5,400 rpm— CEUC: Audi S6 C7, S7, CEUA: A8 D4
 at 5,800 rpm;  from 1,400 rpm to 5,300 rpm— CTGA: A8 D4, A8 D5
 at 5,700 rpm;   from 1,750 rpm to 5,500 rpm— CRDB, CWUB: Audi RS6 C7 and RS7
 at 6,200 rpm;   from 1,700 rpm to 5,500 rpm (overboost to 750 Nm) — DDTA: Audi S8 Plus (D4), CWUC: Audi RS7 Performance, Audi RS6 Performance (C7)
  at 6,000 rpm;  from 1,700 rpm in Porsche Panamera GTS
  at 6,000 rpm;  from 1,700 rpm in Porsche Panamera Turbo
  at 6,000 rpm;  from 1,700 rpm in Porsche Panamera Turbo S
  at 6,000 rpm;  from 1,700 rpm in Porsche Panamera Turbo S E-Hybrid
  at 6,000 rpm;  from 1,700 rpm in Bentley Continental GT V8 and Flying Spur V8
  at 6,000 rpm;  from 1,700 rpm in Bentley Continental GT V8 S
  at 6,000 rpm;  in Bentley Continental GT V8 (2019–)
478 kW (650 PS; 641 bhp) at 6,000 rpm; 850 N⋅m (627 lbf⋅ft) in Lamborghini Urus

471 kW (640 PS; 631 bhp) at 6,000 rpm; 850 N⋅m (627 lbf⋅ft) in Porsche Cayenne Coupé Turbo GT

Audi version of the engine includes electronic monitoring of the oil level, while the Bentley engine includes a dipstick for an oil check. In addition, the Bentley engine uses switchable hydraulic mounts instead of Audi's active electrohydraulic engine mounts. The Bentley engine does not include a stop-start system.

Diesel

4.2 V8 TDI CR 235-257kW 
This Audi engine is an entirely redeveloped and bored-out evolution of the superseded 4.0 V8 TDI CR, now with  cylinder spacing between bore centres, and again with roller chain drive for the overhead camshafts and ancillaries. Just like its 4.0 V8 TDI predecessor, this all-new 4.2 V8 TDI retains the mantle of the world's highest power output car with a diesel V8. This engine is manufactured at Győr, Hungary by AUDI AG subsidiary Audi Hungaria Motor Kft.
identification parts code prefix: 057.C
engine configuration & engine displacement 90° V8 engine, Turbocharged Direct Injection (TDI) turbodiesel; ; bore x stroke: , stroke ratio: 0.87:1 - undersquare/long-stroke, 516.7 cc per cylinder,  cylinder spacing, compression ratio: 16.5:1, water-cooled alternator
cylinder block & crankcase compacted vermicular graphite cast iron (GJV/CGI), ; UV laser-honed exposed bore; cast reinforcing bed-plate lower frame incorporating five main bearings (each 'bearing' affixed by four bolts), die-forged chrome molybdenum alloy steel crossplane crankshaft with first and second order forces and moments avoided, three-part oil sump consisting of cast alloy upper section, a middle baffle section and pressed steel lower section, diagonally fracture-split connecting rods, cast aluminium alloy Kolbenschmidt pistons (Mahle on CCFA), simplex roller chain-driven ancillaries, oil filter module (incorporating oil separator and water-to-oil cooler) mounted within the 'vee' (externally mounted on Marine variants)
cylinder heads & valvetrain cast aluminium alloy; four valves per cylinder, 32 valves total, operated by low-friction roller finger cam followers with automatic hydraulic valve clearance compensation, double overhead camshafts - the inlets driven in a relay method at the rear (flywheel) end of the engine by four simplex roller chains and the exhausts driven from the inlets by automatic slack adjusting spur gears at the front end, two unequal-length swirl-inducing switchable inlet ports, siamesed unequal-length exhaust ports
Engines introduced from 2014 include 2 variable geometry turbocharger with maximum  of relative boost pressure.
aspiration - Marine air filter with hot-film air mass meter, one water-cooled turbocharger with electric boost pressure control mounted within the vee, sea-water tube intercooler, two separate cast alloy intake manifolds interconnected by a "feedthrough" system to equalise the pressure in the two cylinder banks, two-position variable swirl flaps integrated into the intake tract
fuel system & engine management common rail (CR) direct diesel injection: electric low-pressure fuel lift pump, one timing belt-driven  injection pump, two common rail fuel rails (one per cylinder bank), piezo-electric operated fuel injectors with eight-hole nozzles for homogenous fuel delivery, single and double pilot injection, up to four main injection actuations per piston cycle; Bosch EDC16 CP electronic engine control unit (ECU), Bosch MDC Marine Diesel Control on Marine variant.
exhaust system two air-gap insulated fan-branch alloy steel exhaust manifolds, two close-coupled maintenance-free oxidizing catalytic converters, two silicon carbide diesel particulate filters, Euro4 emissions standard compliant
dimensions length: , mass:  (automotive -  lighter than its 4.0 V8 TDI predecessor,  lighter than the all-aluminium alloy Mercedes-Benz 4.0 V8 CDI diesel engine),  (Marine variant: dry weight, including DMF, cooling system & all ancillaries)
DIN-rated power & torque outputs, ID codes
BMC: 
BVN:  at 3,750 rpm;  at 1,600-3,500 rpm
BTR:  at 3,750 rpm;  at 1,800-2,500 rpm
CCFA: 
CEM:  at 4,200 rpm;  at 1,900 rpm
CTEC:  at 3,750 rpm;  at 2,000-2,750 rpm
applications
 Audi D3 A8 4.2 TDI quattro (BMC: 01/05-06/05, BVN: 07/05->), Audi Q7 4.2 TDI (BTR: 03/07-06/09, CCFA: 06/09->), Volkswagen Marine TDI 350-8 (CEM: 02/09->), Volkswagen Touareg, Porsche Cayenne

4.0 V8 TDI 310-320kW 
A successor to the 4.2 TDI. The engine includes 2 turbochargers, 48-volt electrical system, 7 kW electric compressor, Bosch CRS 3.25 engine management.

A turbocharger serves to supply engine boost and spools up the passive turbocharger.

identification
 parts code prefix: EA 898
engine configuration & engine displacement 90° V8 engine, Turbocharged Direct Injection (TDI) turbodiesel; ; bore x stroke: , stroke ratio: 0.91:1 - undersquare/long-stroke, 494.5 cc per c[ylinder,  cylinder spacing, compression ratio: 16.0:1, water-cooled alternator

DIN-rated power and torque outputs, applications, ID codes 
 at 3,500-5,000 rpm;  at 1,000-3,250 rpm, Porsche Panamera II 4S Diesel

 at 3,750-5,000 rpm;  at 1,000-3,250 rpm, Audi SQ7 2016-2020, Audi SQ8 2019-2020, Audi A8 D5, Bentley Bentayga,2020-
VW Touareg

Production
The engine was developed in Ingolstadt.

15.6 V8 DC16 368-544kW (Scania)

engine configuration & engine displacement 90° V8 engine, turbodiesel; ; bore x stroke: , stroke ratio: 0.82:1 - undersquare/long-stroke, 1,950.8 cc per cylinder
aspiration turbocharger, intercooler
fuel system & engine management Scania PDE high-pressure Unit Injector system, Scania selective catalytic reduction (SCR) - catalytic converter with AdBlue urea injection
DIN-rated power & torque outputs - Euro4
  at 1,900 rpm;  at 1,100-1,400 rpm
  at 1,900 rpm;  at 1,100-1,400 rpm
  at 1,900 rpm;  at 1,100-1,400 rpm
DIN-rated power & torque outputs - Euro5
  at 1,800 rpm;  at 1,000-1,350 rpm
  at 1,900 rpm;  at 1,000-1,400 rpm
  at 1,900 rpm;  at 1,000-1,400 rpm
  at 2,000 rpm;  at 1,000-1,400 rpm reference: https://web.archive.org/web/20121112032602/http://www3.scania.com/en/New-V8-truck-range/The-new-730hp-engine/
applications Scania trucks

References

reference 
reference 
references 
reference 
references 
reference 
reference 
references  
reference  
references 
references 

Volkswagen Group
V8 engines
Audi engines
Bentley engines
Lamborghini engines
Volkswagen Group engines
Gasoline engines by model
Diesel engines by model
Engines by model
Piston engines
Internal combustion engine